The team jumping competition at the 2006 FEI World Equestrian Games was held between August 29 and August 31, 2006.

Medalists

Complete results

Round 1
The first round of the team jumping competition was held on August 29, 2006. It was a speed class.

Round 2
The second round of the team jumping competition was held on August 30, 2006.

Final
The final round of the team jumping competition was held on August 31, 2006.

External links
Official list of competitors
Official results
Round 1
Round 2
Final

Jumping
World Equestrian Games Team